Mawbima (lit. Motherland) is a weekly Sinhala language newspaper that publishes news, letters, articles, and features related to Sri Lanka.

References

External links
Mawbima official website

Publications established in 2006
Sinhala-language newspapers published in Sri Lanka
Sunday newspapers published in Sri Lanka
Weekly newspapers published in Sri Lanka
2006 establishments in Sri Lanka